The 2014 Football Federation South Australia season was the 108th season of soccer in South Australia, and the second under the National Premier Leagues format.

League tables

2014 National Premier Leagues South Australia

The National Premier League South Australia 2014 season was the second season under the new competition format in South Australia. It was played over 26 rounds, beginning on 21 February with the regular season concluding on 16 August 2014. The league consisted of 14 teams across the State of South Australia, all playing each other twice for a total of 26 rounds, with the final series winners qualifying for the 2014 National Premier Leagues Finals and the bottom two at the end of the year being relegated to the 2015 FFSA State League.

West Adelaide and South Adelaide joined from the 2013 FFSA State League.

League Table

Finals

2014 NPL State League

The 2014 NPL State League was the second edition of the new NPL State League as the second level domestic association football competition in South Australia (and third level within Australia overall). 15 teams competed, all playing each other twice for a total of 28 rounds, with the league and playoff winners at the end of the year being promoted to the 2015 NPL South Australia.

Promotion Playoff

2014 Women's Premier League

The 9 teams played a double round-robin for a total of 16 games.

Cup Competitions

2014 Federation Cup

South Australian soccer clubs competed in 2014 for the Federation Cup, known as the 2014 Coca-Cola Federation Cup for sponsorship reasons. Clubs entered from the NPL SA and the State League 1.

This knockout competition was won by Adelaide City.

The competition also served as the South Australian Preliminary Rounds for the 2014 FFA Cup. In addition to Adelaide City, the A-League club Adelaide United qualified for the final rounds, entering at the Round of 32.

References

2014 in Australian soccer
Football South Australia seasons